The Motorola Q is a Windows Mobile smartphone first announced in the Summer of 2005 as a thin device with similar styling to Motorola's immensely popular RAZR. Motorola in a partnership with Verizon Wireless released the Q on May 31, 2006. A version for Sprint was released early in January 2007 and one for Amp'd Mobile in April 2007.

The Q differs from Verizon's flagship Windows Mobile phone in that it is very thin, runs the Windows Mobile 5.0 Smartphone Edition OS (lacking touchscreen support), and has a landscape 320x240 screen. It also employs a thumbwheel on the right side of the unit. Motorola hoped to position the Q as an attractive alternative to the BlackBerry.

The Q was first released in Canada on June 15, 2006 with Telus Mobility. Bell Mobility began offering the phone later that year (September 22) and then became the first North American carrier to offer a black version of the Motorola Q on November 13, 2006. 

In late July 2007, a new model of the Moto Q, the Motorola Q 9, was released. The Motorola Q 9h was released in Italy and across Europe and in November in the US through AT&T.  In August of the same year, the Motorola Q9m was released in the US through Verizon.  In November, Sprint offered the Motorola Q9c.  All Q9 models run Windows Mobile 6.

Specifications 

 Mobile phone, CDMA model with 800/1900-MHz bands, CDMA2000 1x and CDMA2000 EV-DO networks.
 Intel XScale  PXA272 312 MHz processor  (Bulverde)
 Runs on Microsoft Windows Mobile 5.0 Smartphone Edition; Optimized for Microsoft Exchange 2003 and a variety of third party email solutions 
 Depth - 11.5mm
 QWERTY thumbboard, 5-way navigation button and thumb wheel
 Connectivity via Bluetooth, IrDA and mini-USB
 Multimedia messaging (MMS) (except on Sprint)
 Audio formats supported: iMelody, MIDI, MP3, AAC, WAV, WMA, WAX, QCELP
 Image formats supported: GIF87a, GIF89a, JPEG, WBMP, BMP, PN 
 Mini-SD removable memory card slot (maximum: 2gb)
 Display: (320 x 240 pixels, 65K TFT)
 1.3-megapixel camera with LED flash
 PIM functionality with picture caller ID
 Speech recognition and speakerphone

Camera specifications and options

Camera 
 1.3-megapixel digital camera
 Normal, burst, and timer camera modes
 7 brightness levels
 5 photo resolutions: 160x120, 176x144, 320x240, 640x480, and 1280x1024
 4 zoom levels: 1x, 2x, 4x, and 6x
 6 white balance options: Automatic, Sunny, Cloudy, Indoor Home, Indoor Office, and Night
 Camera "flash": a white LED on the back of the device (on/off; not synchronized with camera shutter)

PC synchronization 
The Motorola Q has the ability to synchronize via USB or Bluetooth to a Microsoft Outlook or Microsoft Exchange Server database via Windows Mobile Device Center in Windows Vista or via Microsoft ActiveSync in Windows XP and below, allowing the user to synchronize contacts, emails, tasks, and calendar appointments to the Motorola Q. Microsoft Office files may also be synchronized, but Windows Mobile only supports reading them, and only editing Word. PowerPoint and excel are too advanced to edit.

Motorola Q support forums 
The Motorola website includes a forum for user support. Topics include getting started, email setup, bluetooth technology, synching, multimedia features and third party applications.

Error reporting 
As with most smartphones, an automatic error reporting function can be enabled by the user.  Several Q users had found a minor malfunction with the first version of the Q which was exclusively sold by Verizon.  The malfunction showed that after some time while the phone had been in use, that if text messaging/phone calls or internet/text messaging happened together, the phone would freeze for several minutes.  Motorola and Microsoft discovered the error through the error reporting service and now offer an update you can find through Motorola.com.  The update repairs the malfunction and resets the phone.

Black Motorola Q 
Verizon Wireless released a new version of the Q in mid January 2007 in a new color, producing it in black to compete with the T-Mobile Dash and Cingular's Samsung Blackjack. The outer casing was made in a rubber compound to resist scratches. The new Q also featured 15% more battery life and an update to fix bugs.

Complete list of Q features and specifications 
The complete Motorola Q list of specifications are:

References

External links 
 Motorola Q Support Forum
 Specifications at Phonescoop

Q
Windows Mobile Standard devices
Mobile phones introduced in 2006
Mobile phones with an integrated hardware keyboard